Discobola is a genus of crane fly in the family Limoniidae.

Description
Discobola specimens are recognized by their extensively maculate (blotched) or ocellate (spotted) wing markings, by the presence of an A1 cross vein on the wings, and by spined or pectinate (comb like) claws. Specimens from New Zealand are distinctive from those of other locations in having slightly different male genitalia.<ref name="JohnsJenner06">{{cite journal | last = Johns | first = Peter M. |author2=Jenner, Lesley | year = 2006 | title = The Crane-Fly Genus Discobola' (Diptera: Tipulidae: Limoniinae) In New Zealand | journal = Records of the Canterbury Museum | volume = 20 | pages = 35–53 | publisher = Canterbury Museum | location = Christchurch, New Zealand | type = PDF }}</ref>

Distribution
New Zealand, Australia & Chile.

SpeciesD. acurostris (Alexander, 1943)D. annulata (Linnaeus, 1758)D. armorica (Alexander, 1942)D. australis (Skuse, 1890)D. boninensis (Alexander, 1972)D. caesarea (Osten Sacken, 1854)D. calamites (Alexander, 1959)D. caledoniae (Alexander, 1948)D. dicycla Edwards, 1923D. dohrni (Osten Sacken, 1894)D. epiphragmoides (Edwards, 1933)D. euthenia (Alexander, 1958)D. freyana (Nielsen, 1961)D. fumihalterata (Alexander, 1955)D. gibberina (Alexander, 1948)D. gowdeyi (Alexander, 1933)D. haetara Johns and Jenner, 2006D. margarita Alexander, 1924D. moiwana Alexander, 1924D. neoelegans (Alexander, 1954)D. nigroclavata (Alexander, 1943)D. parargus (Edwards, 1933)D. parvispinula (Alexander, 1947)D. striata Edwards, 1923D. taivanella (Alexander, 1930)D. tessellata (Osten Sacken, 1894)D. venustula'' (Alexander, 1929)

References

Limoniidae
Nematocera genera